Space Bio Charge  is a compilation album of famous Japanese composer Yoko Kanno with her band, Seatbelts, under the name Yoko Kanno Seatbelts.

Track listing

Catalog Number VTCL-60141~3

CD 1 track list

CD 2 track list

CD 3 track list

Charts

References

2009 albums
Yoko Kanno albums
Victor Entertainment albums